Hohe Warte (Spessart) is a wooded hill of Bavaria, Germany. It has an elevation of up to 572 meters above NHN and lies in the Spessart range. 

Hohe Wart is located in the unincorporated area Rohrbrunner Forst, part of the Aschaffenburg district. To the north Bundesautobahn 3 passes. To the west is the Spessart Hochstrasse. 

Note that the similarly named Hohe Wart is a different hill near Leidersbach.

Hills of Bavaria
Aschaffenburg (district)
Hills of the Spessart